Peter Gabriel Magnaye de Jesus (born 9 April 1992) is a Filipino badminton player. He won the men's doubles title at the 2014 Swiss International tournament with Paul Jefferson Vivas, and the mixed doubles title at the 2019 Sydney International with Thea Pomar.

Achievements

BWF International Challenge/Series 
Men's doubles

Mixed doubles

  BWF International Challenge tournament
  BWF International Series tournament

References

External links 
 

Living people
1992 births
Sportspeople from Manila
Filipino male badminton players
Competitors at the 2011 Southeast Asian Games
Competitors at the 2013 Southeast Asian Games
Competitors at the 2015 Southeast Asian Games
Competitors at the 2017 Southeast Asian Games
Competitors at the 2019 Southeast Asian Games
Southeast Asian Games competitors for the Philippines